The 17 cm Kanone in Eisenbahnlafette (17 cm K (E)) was a German railroad gun used in the Second World War.

Design & History
This weapon was designed with the intent of replacing the 15 cm K (E) mounted on the same carriage, although only 6 were built before it was realized that both guns were too small to justify railroad mounts. The gun was mounted on a simple pivot mount on a ballrace on a well-base flatcar with four outriggers. In action the outriggers and their jacks would be dropped to stabilize the gun and absorb the firing recoil. In addition jacks locked the spring suspension, bore on the surface of the rails and screw clamps gripped the rails for more stability. The elderly 17 cm Schnelladekanone L/40 was used because it was available in some numbers, having been designed as the casemate gun for the  predreadnought battleships. It fired a 17 cm Sprgr L/4.7 KZ mit Hb shell weighing . This was a standard HE shell with a nose fuze beneath a ballistic cap.

They spent the war assigned to Artillerie-Batteries 717 and 718 (E) along the Channel coast.

References 
* Engelmann, Joachim and Scheibert, Horst. Deutsche Artillerie 1934-1945: Eine Dokumentation in Text, Skizzen und Bildern: Ausrüstung, Gliederung, Ausbildung, Führung, Einsatz. Limburg/Lahn, Germany: C. A. Starke, 1974
 François, Guy. Eisenbahnartillerie: Histoire de l'artillerie lourd sur voie ferrée allemande des origines à 1945. Paris: Editions Histoire et Fortifications, 2006
 Gander, Terry and Chamberlain, Peter. Weapons of the Third Reich: An Encyclopedic Survey of All Small Arms, Artillery and Special Weapons of the German Land Forces 1939-1945. New York: Doubleday, 1979 
 Hogg, Ian V. German Artillery of World War Two. 2nd corrected edition. Mechanicsville, PA: Stackpole Books, 1997 
 Kosar, Franz. Eisenbahngeschütz der Welt. Stuttgart: Motorbook, 1999 

World War II artillery of Germany
Railway guns
173 mm artillery
Military equipment introduced in the 1930s

pl:15 cm Kanone (Eisenbahn)